The men's English billiards doubles tournament at the 2006 Asian Games in Doha took place from 6 December to 7 December at Al-Sadd Multi-Purpose Hall.

The teams were seeded based on their final ranking at the same event at the 2002 Asian Games in Busan.

Thailand won the gold after beating Myanmar in the final 3 to 1, while bronze medal went to Indian team, they beat Pakistan in the bronze medal match 3 to 0.

Schedule
All times are Arabia Standard Time (UTC+03:00)

Results

References 
Results
Draw

External links 
 Official Website

Cue sports at the 2006 Asian Games